Cychrus signatus is a species of ground beetle in the subfamily of Carabinae. It was described by Faldermann in 1835.

References

signatus
Beetles described in 1835